Enid is a 2009 British biographical television film first broadcast on 16 November on BBC Four. Directed by James Hawes it is based on the life of children's writer Enid Blyton, portrayed by Helena Bonham Carter. The film introduced the two main lovers of Blyton's life. Her first husband Hugh Pollock, who was also her publisher, was played by Matthew Macfadyen. Kenneth Darrell Waters, a London surgeon who became Blyton's second husband, was portrayed by Denis Lawson. The film explored how the orderly, reassuringly clear worlds Blyton created within her stories contrasted with the complexity of her own personal life.

Cast
 Helena Bonham Carter as Enid Blyton 
 Matthew Macfadyen as Hugh Pollock, Blyton's publisher, first husband, and father of her two daughters Gillian and Imogen.
 Denis Lawson as Kenneth Darrell Waters: A London surgeon who becomes Blyton's second husband following her divorce from Pollock.
 Travis Oliver as Corporal Alexander Morris
 Ramona Marquez as Imogen Pollock
 Sinead Michael as Gillian Pollock
 Claire Rushbrook as Dorothy Richards
 Joseph Millson as Hanly Blyton
 Pooky Quesnel as Theresa Blyton
 Philip Wright as Thomas Blyton
 Lisa Diveney as Enid Blyton (aged 19)
 Alexandra Brain as Enid Blyton (aged 12)
 Samuel Hilton as Hanly Blyton (aged 8)
 James Warner as Carey Blyton (aged 4)
 Eileen O'Higgins as Maid Maggie
 Gabrielle Reidy as Mrs Waters
 Sion Davies as Boy at party
 Isabella Blake-Thomas as Girl at party

Awards

Production
The film was filmed in London and Surrey in Britain. The film is a "major one-off" drama for Carnival Film & Television for BBC Four.

References

External links
 
 BBC Press Release

2009 television films
2009 films
British biographical drama films
2009 biographical drama films
Biographical films about writers
Films scored by Nicholas Hooper
Films set in England
Films set in the 1920s
Films set in the 1930s
Films set in the 1940s
Films set in the 1950s
Enid Blyton
2009 drama films
Films directed by James Hawes
2000s English-language films
2000s British films
British drama television films